Saint Saviour's Church is a parish church in the Church of England in The Meadows, Nottingham.

The church is Grade II listed by the Department for Digital, Culture, Media and Sport as it is a building of special architectural or historic interest.

History
The parish was formed out of that of St. Mary's Church, Nottingham. The foundation stone of the church building was laid by the Rt. Revd. John Jackson, Bishop of Lincoln, on 28 September 1863.  The nave of the church was opened for worship in 1864 and was designed by the local architect Richard Charles Sutton funded by the Ecclesiastical Commissioners. It replaced a small mission chapel which had served the residents of the Meadows but became too small for the increasing population after the enclosure of the Meadows.

The chancel occupies the east end, with a vestry on the one side and the organ chamber on the other. The length of the nave is 74 ft., and the width 24 ft.; the aisles are each 74 ft. long and 17 ft. wide. The chancel is 30 ft. deep by 24 ft. wide. The height of the nave is 46 ft. It was designed to accommodate seats for 750 people.

The amount of the contract was about £3,000,. The contractor was a local builder, John Barker, based in Arkwright-street, The Meadows. The vicarage to designs by Frederick Bakewell was added in 1867.

The east end was remodelled in 1913 by local architect, Thomas Wright.

The church is located on Arkwright Walk.

Today 
Worship services are held weekly at 4:30 PM.  The congregation is in an informal partnership with the local Salvation Army church, with joint worship services held each Sunday.

In 2013 the main church building was renovated to make room for an indoor softplay centre and café.  Eden Softplay is open seven days a week for children and families to enjoy.

References

Sources
 The Buildings of England, Nottinghamshire. Nikolaus Pevsner

External links
 See St. Saviour's Church on Google Street View
 Saviour's Church website
 Eden Softplay

Churches in Nottingham
Grade II listed churches in Nottinghamshire
Churches completed in 1864
19th-century Church of England church buildings
Church of England church buildings in Nottinghamshire